Chipboard may refer to:

 A type of paperboard, made from reclaimed paper stock
 White lined chipboard, a grade of paperboard
 Particle board, a type of engineered wood known as chipboard in some countries